Hysen Pasha Mosque or Clock Mosque (Xhamia e Sahatit) is a Cultural Monument of Albania, located in Berat. It was built in 1670 by Hussein Pasha. It is named Clock Mosque because in 1870 the Ottomans built a clock tower next to it. The clock tower was destroyed during the Communist dictatorship in 1967. The mosque also got destroyed with the minaret being the only part left over. After the end of Communism the mosque got renovated.

See also
 Islam in Albania

References

Cultural Monuments of Albania
Mosques in Berat
Ottoman architecture in Albania
Mosques completed in 1670
1670 establishments in the Ottoman Empire